"Bubble Trip / Sweet Sweet Song"  is the sixth single of singer Anna Tsuchiya. This single to be released in two versions: a limited edition CD+DVD version and a regular CD only version. BUBBLE TRIP is described as a song that blends R&B and rock, and is produced by KNS Productions(who had previously produced songs from Britney Spears third and fourth albums). The song was used as the Herbal Essences Japan CM song. The other A-side, sweet sweet song, was used as the Daiichikosho karaoke company Premium DAM CM song.

Track listing

2007 singles
Anna Tsuchiya songs
Song recordings produced by Brian Kierulf
Songs written by Brian Kierulf
Songs written by Josh Schwartz
Song recordings produced by Josh Schwartz